Digya National Park is the second largest national park and the oldest protected area in Ghana. It is located in the Bono East Region. It was created in 1900 and given national park status in 1971. The park is the only wildlife territory in Ghana to have Lake Volta at its borders.

Geography
Occupying an area of 3,743 square kilometers, the park is the second largest national park in Ghana. It is in the Bono East region and is bordered on the north, south, and east by Lake Volta. Located on a lowland peninsula, it has an undulating terrain. It is located in a transitional area between a forest and savanna.

History
Digya National Park was created in 1900 as a protected area, the first in Ghana. It was acquired by the government and gazetted as a national park in 1971. When the government acquired the park, there were living settlements in the park, with most of the residents being fishermen and farmers. In 2006, there were 49 settlements and the government of Ghana began evicting settlement residents from the park. In early 2005, a patrol-based system was established in the park to curb illegal activity.

Wildlife
The park is home to at least six primate species and elephants belonging to some of the less studied species in Africa. The elephant population in the park is the second largest in Ghana. Antelope species can he found at the park as well. There are also manatees and clawless otters in arms of Lake Volta that extend into Digya National Park. More than 236 species of birds live in the park. This park is the only wildlife territory in Ghana to border on Lake Volta, the largest man-made body of water in the country.

References

National parks of Ghana
Protected areas established in 1900
1900 establishments in Gold Coast (British colony)